Petar Kunić (born 15 July 1993) is a Bosnian professional footballer who plays as a striker for Serbian club Napredak Kruševac.

Club career
Born in Drvar, Bosnia and Herzegovina, Kunić started playing in the youth teams of Borac Banja Luka. He debuted for Borac senior squad in the 2009–10 Premier League of Bosnia and Herzegovina. He played with Borac at Bosnian premiership until summer 2013 when he signed with Czech First League side FK Dukla Prague. He stayed two years with Dukla however he failed to make a debut in the league and he spent most time on loan to other clubs, first season back with Borac, and the following one with Radnik Bijeljina, another Bosnian Serb club playing in the Bosnian Premier League, as also Sloboda Mrkonjić Grad in the First League of the Republika Srpska. It will be however a third Bosnian Serb side playing in Bosnian top-tier that will buy Kunić from Dukla in summer 2015, Rudar Prijedor. Kunić was a regular throughout the entire 2015–16 Premier League of Bosnia and Herzegovina season, however, due to bad results, and also the restructuring of the league which was having the number of participating clubs reduced from 16 to 12, Rudar Prijedor ended up relegated to the First League of the Republika Srpska. That situation made Rudar to become vulnerable in order to keep their crucial players, and Serbian top-flight side FK Novi Pazar took the chance to bring Kunić to their ranks in summer 2016. Kunić made his debut for Novi Pazar in the 2016–17 Serbian SuperLiga in the first round game against Javor Ivanjica, when he entered as a substitute in the 69th minute of the game, which ended a 1–1 draw.

International career
In 2013, Kunić played one game for the Bosnia and Herzegovina national U21 team in the 2015 UEFA Euro U21 qualifying game against Albania.

Honours
Borac Banja Luka 
Bosnian Premier League: 2010–11
Bosnian Cup: 2009–10

References

External links
Petar Kunić at Sofascore

1993 births
Living people
People from Drvar
Association football forwards
Serbian footballers
Serbia youth international footballers
Bosnia and Herzegovina footballers
Bosnia and Herzegovina under-21 international footballers
FK Borac Banja Luka players
FK Dukla Prague players
FK Radnik Bijeljina players
FK Sloboda Mrkonjić Grad players
FK Rudar Prijedor players
FK Novi Pazar players
Athlitiki Enosi Larissa F.C. players
HŠK Zrinjski Mostar players
FC Atyrau players
FK Napredak Kruševac players
Premier League of Bosnia and Herzegovina players
Serbian SuperLiga players
Super League Greece players
Kazakhstan Premier League players
Bosnia and Herzegovina expatriate footballers
Expatriate footballers in the Czech Republic
Bosnia and Herzegovina expatriate sportspeople in the Czech Republic
Expatriate footballers in Greece
Bosnia and Herzegovina expatriate sportspeople in Greece
Expatriate footballers in Kazakhstan
Bosnia and Herzegovina expatriate sportspeople in Kazakhstan
Expatriate footballers in Serbia
Bosnia and Herzegovina expatriate sportspeople in Serbia